The Aljezur River is a small river in the Portuguese region of the Algarve.

Description 
From its confluence the river loops through a ravine around the base of a hill on which is the ruins of the Morrish castle of Aljezur. The Moors constructed a port at the base of the castle and made the river navigable out to the ocean at Amoreira. The river and port remained navigable until the 18th century after which channel fell into a state of disrepair following the destruction of the village caused by the 1755 earthquake.

From Aljezur the river meanders through a narrow valley which is within the Vicentine Coast Natural Park at the seaward end the river opens up to a narrow marshland estuary. This habitat supports such creatures as kingfishers, marsh warblers, grey herons and otters.

References 

Aljezur
Aljezur
Aljezur